The Goldsmiths Prize is a British literary award, founded in 2013 by Goldsmiths, University of London, in association with the New Statesman. It is awarded annually to a piece of fiction that "breaks the mould or extends the possibilities of the novel form." It is limited to citizens and residents of the United Kingdom and Ireland, and to novels published by presses based in the United Kingdom or Ireland. The winner receives £10,000. Tim Parnell of the Goldsmiths English department conceived and runs the prize, inspired by his research into Laurence Sterne and other eighteenth-century writers, like Denis Diderot, who experimented with the novel form. The prize "casts its net wider than most other prizes" and intends to celebrate "creative daring," but resists the phrase "experimental fiction," because it implies "an eccentric deviation from the novel’s natural concerns, structures and idioms." To date, Rachel Cusk is the author best represented on the prize's shortlists, having been shortlisted for each book of her Outline trilogy.

Winners and shortlists
Blue Ribbon = winner

References

External links

Goldsmiths Prize, official website.
A new literary prize celebrating boldly original fiction, New Statesman announcement of award.

 
English literary awards
Awards established in 2013
2013 establishments in the United Kingdom
British fiction awards
Goldsmiths, University of London